Mickael Ulile (born 16 July 1997) is a New Caledonian footballer who plays as a goalkeeper for Abbeville. He made his debut for the national team on 8 October 2016 in their 1–0 win against the Solomon Islands.

References

1998 births
Living people
New Caledonian footballers
New Caledonia international footballers
Association football goalkeepers
AS Magenta players
Gaïtcha FCN players